Sabonga is a town of about 10,000 people in Birni-N'Konni Department, Tahoua Region, Niger.

Populated places in Niger

Tahoua Region